A250 may refer to:
 A former designation for the Airbus A300 aircraft
 A250 road (England)